The 2022 Calder Cup playoffs was the postseason tournament of the American Hockey League (AHL) to determine the winner of the Calder Cup, which is awarded to the AHL playoff champions.

2022 marked the return of postseason play for the AHL after two seasons of no playoffs due to the COVID-19 pandemic.  The 2022 playoffs began on May 2, 2022, with a new 23-team playoff format. All but the bottom two teams of each division qualified for the playoffs. Each division had a best-of-three series in the first round to determine the top 16 teams for the division semifinals, with various teams receiving byes.

The 16 teams that remained—four from each division—played a best-of-five series in the division semifinals, with the playoffs continuing with another best-of-five series for the division finals and a best-of-seven series for the conference finals and Calder Cup finals.

Playoff seeds
After the 2021–22 AHL regular season, 23 teams qualified for the playoffs. All but the bottom two teams in each division ranked by points percentage qualify for the 2022 Calder Cup playoffs. The Stockton Heat were the first team to clinch a playoff spot on March 19, while the Chicago Wolves won the regular season title on the final day of the regular season.

Eastern Conference

Atlantic Division
 Charlotte Checkers – 90 points (.625), 36 
 Springfield Thunderbirds – 95 points (.625), 31 
 Providence Bruins – 83 points (.576)
 Wilkes-Barre/Scranton Penguins – 78 points (.513), 26 
 Hershey Bears – 78 points (.513), 23 
 Bridgeport Islanders – 73 points (.507)

North Division
 Utica Comets – 95 points (.660)
 Syracuse Crunch – 91 points (.599)
 Laval Rocket – 85 points (.590)
 Belleville Senators – 84 points (.583)
 Rochester Americans – 84 points (.553)

Western Conference

Central Division
 Chicago Wolves – 110 points (.724)
 Manitoba Moose – 89 points (.618)
 Milwaukee Admirals – 87 points (.572)
 Rockford IceHogs – 79 points (.549)
 Texas Stars – 76 points (.528)

Pacific Division
 Stockton Heat – 97 points (.714)
 Ontario Reign – 91 points (.669)
 Colorado Eagles – 85 points (.625) 
 Bakersfield Condors – 84 points (.618), 32 
 Abbotsford Canucks – 84 points (.618), 30 
 Henderson Silver Knights – 75 points (.551)
 San Diego Gulls – 63 points (.463)

Bracket

First round

Eastern Conference

(A3) Providence Bruins vs. (A6) Bridgeport Islanders

(A4) Wilkes-Barre/Scranton Penguins vs. (A5) Hershey Bears

(N4) Belleville Senators vs. (N5) Rochester Americans

Western Conference

(C4) Rockford IceHogs vs. (C5) Texas Stars

(P2) Ontario Reign vs. (P7) San Diego Gulls

(P3) Colorado Eagles vs. (P6) Henderson Silver Knights

(P4) Bakersfield Condors vs. (P5) Abbotsford Canucks

Division Semifinals

Eastern Conference

(A1) Charlotte Checkers vs. (A6) Bridgeport Islanders

(A2) Springfield Thunderbirds vs. (A4) Wilkes-Barre/Scranton Penguins

(N1) Utica Comets vs. (N5) Rochester Americans

(N2) Syracuse Crunch vs. (N3) Laval Rocket

Western Conference

(C1) Chicago Wolves  vs. (C4) Rockford IceHogs

(C2) Manitoba Moose vs. (C3) Milwaukee Admirals

(P1) Stockton Heat vs. (P4) Bakersfield Condors

(P2) Ontario Reign vs. (P3) Colorado Eagles

Division Finals

Eastern Conference

(A1) Charlotte Checkers vs. (A2) Springfield Thunderbirds

(N3) Laval Rocket vs. (N5) Rochester Americans

Western Conference

(C1) Chicago Wolves vs. (C3) Milwaukee Admirals

(P1) Stockton Heat vs. (P3) Colorado Eagles

Conference Finals

Eastern Conference

(A2) Springfield Thunderbirds vs. (N3) Laval Rocket

Western Conference

(C1) Chicago Wolves vs. (P1) Stockton Heat

Calder Cup Finals

(C1) Chicago Wolves vs. (A2) Springfield Thunderbirds

Playoff statistical leaders

Leading skaters
These are the top ten skaters based on points. If there is a tie in points, goals take precedence over assists.

Leading goaltenders
This is a combined table of the top five goaltenders based on goals against average and the top five goaltenders based on save percentage with at least 60 minutes played. The table is initially sorted by goals against average, with the criterion for inclusion in bold.

References

External links
AHL official site

Calder Cup playoffs
Calder Cup Playoffs